The 2015 Morocco Tennis Tour – Kenitra was a professional tennis tournament played on clay courts. It was the 3rd edition of the tournament which was part of the 2015 ATP Challenger Tour. It took place in Kenitra, Morocco between 14 and 20 September.

Singles main-draw entrants

Seeds

 1 Rankings are as of September 7, 2015.

Other entrants
The following players received wildcards into the singles main draw:
  Amine Ahouda
  Khalid Allouch
  Mehdi Jdi
  Younès Rachidi

The following players received entry from the qualifying draw:
  Kevin Krawietz
  Luca Margaroli
  Yannik Reuter
  Pol Toledo Bagué

Champions

Singles

  Roberto Carballés Baena def.  Oriol Roca Batalla, 6–1, 5–1 retired

Doubles

  Gerard Granollers /  Oriol Roca Batalla def.  Kevin Krawietz /  Maximilian Marterer, 3–6, 7–6(7–4), [10–8]

External links
 Official website

Morocco Tennis Tour - Kenitra
2015 Morocco Tennis Tour
Morocco Tennis Tour – Kenitra